La Barca may refer to:

La Barca (municipality), town and municipality of Jalisco
"La Barca", 1957 bolero by Roberto Cantoral